Norman Nuñez Pipersburgh (born 12 June 1971) is a Belizean professional football striker, who currently plays for Hankook Verdes.

Club career
The much-travelled Nuñez has played for many different teams in his native Belize and had a short spell at Honduran side CD Marathón. He was 7 times the Belize Premier Football League top goalscorer.

International career
Nicknamed Tilliman, Nuñez made his debut for Belize his country's first FIFA acknowledged competitive game, an UNCAF Cup match against El Salvador in November 1995 and went on to earn a total of 11 caps, scoring 3 goals. He has represented Belize in 3 FIFA World Cup qualification matches and played at the 2001 and 2005 UNCAF Nations Cup.

His final international was at that 2005 UNCAF tournament, Belize's third game against Nicaragua.

International goals
Scores and results list Belize's goal tally first.

External links

References

1971 births
Living people
Belizean footballers
Belize international footballers
Belizean expatriate footballers
C.D. Marathón players
Liga Nacional de Fútbol Profesional de Honduras players
Expatriate footballers in Honduras
2001 UNCAF Nations Cup players

Association football forwards
FC Belize players
Verdes FC players